Georges Point is the northern tip of Rongé Island, lying west of Arctowski Peninsula off the west coast of Graham Land, Antarctica. It was discovered and named by the Belgian Antarctic Expedition (1897–99, under Adrien de Gerlache), probably after second-in-command Georges Lecointe.

References

Headlands of Graham Land
Danco Coast